The British Rail Research Division was established in 1964 directly under the control of the British Railways Board, moving into purpose-built premises at the Railway Technical Centre in Derby. The intention was to improve railway reliability and efficiency, while reducing costs and improving revenue. In so doing it became recognised as a centre of excellence and, in time, was providing consultancy to other railways around the world. While it became famous for the Advanced Passenger Train (APT), its activities extended into every area of railway operation. The theoretical rigour of its approach to railway engineering superseded the ad hoc methods that had prevailed previously.

Work
The Research Division brought together personnel and expertise from all over the country, including the LMS Scientific Research Laboratory. Its remit was not simply the improvement of existing equipment, or the solution of existing problems, but fundamental research from first principles, into railway operation. The results of its work would go on to inform development by engineers, manufacturers and railways all over the world. For instance, once the initial APT-E experimental project was complete, it passed to the mechanical engineering department to build the APT-P prototype. In time, engineers would be seconded to other countries for varying periods under the trade name "Transmark".

One of the first major projects was the development of profiled/pre-worn wheels which helped counter the tendency of new wheels to hunt. This led to research into vehicle suspensions, and the creation of the four-wheel High Speed Freight Vehicle which proved stable at up to 140 mph when tested on the roller rig.

Other work involved looking at the tamping of ballast, properties of subsoils, and rail prestressing. A large part of the network had been converted to continuous welded rail which, during a hot summer, caused many problems with rail buckling. Although there were no injuries, there were a number of derailments. Attention focused on the costs and benefits of tamping the ballast over the sleeper ends.

There were extended studies into metal fatigue, and pioneering work in ultrasound crack detection at a time when it was being investigated elsewhere for medical diagnostics. The Research Division was involved in new signalling systems, such as Solid State Interlocking and the Integrated Electronic Control Centre, and in the design of the overhead lines for the West Coast Main Line.

The Research Division developed two test tracks. The first was on the old Great Northern Railway line between Egginton Junction and Derby Friargate (later used only as far as Mickleover) and was used by the Train Control Group. When the Advanced Passenger Train was being developed, a second test track was created on the line between Melton Junction and Edwalton (known as the Old Dalby Test Track), which was acquired specifically to test this revolutionary train. The Mickleover test track was closed and lifted in the early 1990s but Old Dalby is still in use today.

End of the line
In 1986 finance for the division was moved from the board to the operating divisions. Thus emphasis shifted from pure research to problem solving. In 1989, BR Research became a self-contained unit working under contract to British Rail and other customers, and the way was open for privatisation.
   
When British Rail was sold into private ownership, the Research Division (which had become "BR Research Limited") was bought by AEA Technology in 1996. The resulting business, "AEA Technology Rail", was subsequently sold in 2006 to a venture capital company and became DeltaRail Group. Transmark, the consultancy arm, was sold to Halcrow to become Halcrow Transmark.

A somewhat dated display of material relating to the work of the Division was maintained in the Derby Industrial Museum.

Legacy
The Research Division had an uneasy relationship with other parts of BR, and like most of the products of Harold Wilson's "white heat of technology" speech, were killed off in the early 1980s. The basis of the unease was the traditional approach of most of BR compared with theoretical and aerospace approaches adopted by the Research Division. The hiring of graduates rather than training people up internally also caused tensions.

It could be somewhat tactless, or perhaps naive, at times. The APT-E was provided with a single driver position central in the cab, at a time when the unions were resisting the loss of the "second man" (the fireman in steam days). After its first run out to Duffield the APT-E was blacked (boycotted) by the unions for a year.

Nevertheless, its empirical research into vehicle dynamics has produced today's high speed trains, both freight and passenger, including the InterCity 125 and InterCity 225. The concept of a tilting system for the APT became part of the Pendolino, while the products of its signalling and operations control research are used over a significant amount of the British railway system.

References

Further reading

Marsden Colin, J. (1989) 25 years of railway research. Oxford Publishing Co. Oxford, SBN 86093 441 1. 112 Pages.

External links
Dave Coxon's site about train testing at the Research Division in the 1970s and 80s
A selection of the research papers published by the division
Access to searchable abstracts of most research papers published by the division (free access, but registration required)
Department for Transport "A strategy for regeneration of rail research in Great Britain" A belated acknowledgement of the part played by British Rail's research effort

British Rail research and development
Collections of Derby Museum and Art Gallery
Engineering research institutes
Organisations based in Derby
Rail transport in Derby
Science and technology in Derbyshire
1964 establishments in England